Jordan Rempel (born April 20, 1985) is a former professional Canadian football offensive lineman. He played for the Hamilton Tiger-Cats and Saskatchewan Roughriders of the Canadian Football League. He was drafted by the Hamilton Tiger-Cats in the second round of the 2007 CFL Draft. He played CIS football for the Saskatchewan Huskies football team. He is currently a process operator at Mosaic Belle Plaine potash mine.

External links
Saskatchewan Roughriders bio
Hamilton Tiger-Cats bio

1985 births
Living people
Canadian football offensive linemen
Hamilton Tiger-Cats players
Players of Canadian football from Saskatchewan
Saskatchewan Huskies football players
Saskatchewan Roughriders players